The 1997 Speedway Grand Prix of Sweden was the second race of the 1997 Speedway Grand Prix season. It took place on 14 June in the Motorstadium in Linköping, Sweden It was the third Swedish SGP and was won by Polish rider Tomasz Gollob. It was the second win of his career.

Starting positions draw 

The Speedway Grand Prix Commission nominated Jason Crump from Australia as Wild Card.

Heat details

The intermediate classification

See also 
 Speedway Grand Prix
 List of Speedway Grand Prix riders

References

External links 
 FIM-live.com
 SpeedwayWorld.tv

Speedway Grand Prix of Sweden
S
1997